Gareb Shamus (born December 23, 1968) is the founder and former chairman and CEO of Wizard Entertainment and the co-founder and CEO of ACE Comic Con. He was the publisher of Wizard: The Comics Magazine; InQuest Gamer: The Gaming Magazine; ToyFare: The Toy Magazine; Anime Insider; FunFare; "In" Power, a kids entertainment magazine; Wizard Specials; Toy Wishes, a holiday toy shopping guide; Bean Power, a Beanie Babies magazine; and Sportslook, a sports card magazine. He also co-founded and served as CEO of International Fight League Inc (IFLI). He produced several televised MMA fights with partners Fox Sports Networks and MyNetworkTV. He is the owner of The Pivot Gallery in New York City and an exhibited artist in America and Europe.

Early life
Gareb is the second oldest of four brothers, Ilan, Kenny and Stephen Shamus. As a child, he collected comic books and sports cards. His early loves were Spider-Man, Batman, and Mad magazine. As a teenager, he gravitated to more mature comics created by artists like Todd McFarlane and Frank Miller (who began working on The Dark Knight Returns and Daredevil when Shamus was a teenager in the 1980s). Shamus studied economics at the University at Albany, SUNY and graduated magna cum laude with a Bachelor of Arts degree in economics and a minor in art in 1990.

Wizard Entertainment 

In the 1980s, Shamus' parents opened a sports card and comic book store in Nanuet, New York, where Shamus worked. When he graduated from college, he started comic book newsletter, Wizard: The Guide to Comics, for the store’s customers. It became so popular that in 1991 he turned it into a monthly magazine. After only one year, Wizard went worldwide, published in over fifty countries and in multiple languages, and Shamus became a celebrity in the comic book world. Over the next few years he launched more magazines covering toys, games, animation and everything “superhero” (movies, TV shows, video games and toys).

As Wizard Entertainment, Shamus bought the Chicago Comicon in 1997, and expanded its scope and boosted attendance from a few thousand to 25,000 the following year. There are 21 Wizard World comic conventions and pop-culture conventions in the United States.

Painter 
Shamus is an emerging contemporary painter. He resides in the West Village.

Selected exhibitions
 "Squeezed," Coldstream Fine Art, Toronto, July 8 - August 2, 2017
 “Rungs of Life," Art Exchange London, September 23, 2016
 “Early Days," Art Helix, Brooklyn, September 16, 2016
 “The Pivot Collection,” MRG Fine Art, Sherman Oaks, California, July 16, 2016
 “All Art Everything”, Guy Hepner Gallery, New York, April 8, 2016

References

External links

Living people
1968 births
People from Tenafly, New Jersey
University at Albany, SUNY alumni
Magazine publishers (people)